Brachychira is a genus of moths of the family Notodontidae. The genus was erected by Per Olof Christopher Aurivillius in 1905.

Species
Brachychira alternata Kiriakoff, 1966
Brachychira argentina Kiriakoff, 1955
Brachychira argyrosticta Kiriakoff, 1954
Brachychira bernardii Kiriakoff, 1966
Brachychira davus Kiriakoff, 1965
Brachychira destituta Kiriakoff, 1966
Brachychira dormitans Berio, 1937
Brachychira elegans Aurivillius, 1907
Brachychira exusta Kiriakoff, 1966
Brachychira ferruginea Aurivillius, 1905
Brachychira incerta Kiriakoff, 1966
Brachychira ligata Kiriakoff, 1955
Brachychira lunuligera Kiriakoff, 1954
Brachychira murina Kiriakoff, 1966
Brachychira numenius Kiriakoff, 1955
Brachychira pretiosa Kiriakoff, 1962
Brachychira punctulata Kiriakoff, 1966
Brachychira subargentea Kiriakoff, 1955

External links

Aurivillius, C. (1905). "Lieutnant A. Schultze's Sammlung von Lepidopteren aus West-Afrika". Arkiv för Zoologi. 2 (12): 1–47, pls. 1–5.

Notodontidae